The Cross of Valour is a Polish military decoration. It was first introduced by the Council of National Defense on 11 August 1920. It is awarded to an individual who "has demonstrated deeds of valour and courage on the field of battle." It may be awarded to the same person up to four times. The medal is given only in wartime or shortly after.

History

Polish-Soviet War
The medal was introduced in 1920 at the height of the Polish-Soviet War, shortly before the climactic Battle of Warsaw. Initially it had no Order Council and was awarded personally by the Commander-in-Chief of the Polish Army. Later the option was added of delegating the medal's granting to front and division commanders.

Through 29 May 1923, when the last medal for the Polish-Soviet War was awarded, the Cross of Valour had been granted to some 60,000 soldiers.

Apart from individuals who had participated in the Polish-Soviet War, the medal had also been awarded retroactively to some soldiers of the Polish Legions, of World War I military units, of the Silesian Uprisings, of the Great Poland Uprising, and to members of the Polish Military Organization. It had been awarded, as well, to veterans of the January 1863 Uprising and to the city of Płock.

World War II
In January 1940 the Polish Commander-in-Chief, Władysław Sikorski, issued an order reintroducing the Cross of Valour.  On 20 September, the President of Poland agreed to award the medal to eligible individuals who had already been awarded it four times during the Polish-Soviet War.

People's Republic of Poland
In 1943, after the Battle of Lenino, General Zygmunt Berling, commander of the Soviet-backed Polish 1st Corps, awarded the Cross of Valour to several soldiers. The medal itself was approved as a military decoration by order of the communist-led State National Council on 22 December 1944. Up to 1947, some 40,000 of the medals were awarded to Polish soldiers fighting alongside the Red Army.

Notes

References
 Zdzislaw P. Wesolowski, Polish Orders, Medals, Badges and Insignia:  Military and Civilian Decorations, 1705–1985, Miami, 1986.

Military awards and decorations of Poland
Awards established in 1920
Awards established in 1940
Awards established in 1944
 
Courage awards